Scyphonychium is a monotypic genus of flowering plants belonging to the family Sapindaceae. The only species is Scyphonychium multiflorum.

Its native range is French Guiana to Northern and Northeastern Brazil.

References

Sapindaceae
Monotypic Sapindaceae genera